Specialism may refer to:

 School specialism, a subject that a British school specialises in; see Specialist schools in the United Kingdom
 Academic specialism, an academic field that a college or university specialises in
 Military specialism

See also
 Specialization (disambiguation)
 Specialist (disambiguation)